Hoosh (occasionally spelt hooch) is a thick stew made from pemmican (a mix of dried meat, fat, and cereal) or other meat, thickener such as ground biscuits, and water.  It was the common food of early twentieth century Antarctic expeditions, used, for example, by the expeditions of Robert Falcon Scott (1910–1913) and Ernest Shackleton (1914–1916).

Sometimes, the term was also used for mixed food rations for ponies and mules (e.g. in The Worst Journey in the World by Apsley Cherry-Garrard).

See also

 List of Antarctic expeditions
 List of stews

References

Further reading
 

Meat stews